SV Excelsior is an amateur football club from the Commewijne District town of Meerzorg, Suriname. The club was founded in the late 1920s and spent most of its tenure in the top flight of Surinamese football. Recently, the club had been in a dry spell, and spend time in the second tier of Surinamese football, only recently to be promoted back into the Hoofdklasse.

Honors 
SVB Hoofdklasse
 Champions: 1930–31

SVB Eerste Klasse
 Runners-up: 2009–10

Beker van Suriname: 1
 Winners: 2010

Current squad 

 
Excelsior
Excelsior
Meerzorg